Zapadny Ugol is a rural locality (a selo) in Petukhovsky Selsoviet, Klyuchevsky District, Altai Krai, Russia. The population was 80 as of 2013. There are 3 streets.

Geography 
Zapadny Ugol is located 41 km southeast of Klyuchi (the district's administrative centre) by road. Poluyamki is the nearest rural locality.

References 

Rural localities in Klyuchevsky District